Leitrim was a parliamentary constituency represented in Dáil Éireann, the lower house of the Oireachtas (the Irish parliament) from 1937 to 1948. The constituency elected 3 deputies (Teachtaí Dála, commonly known as TDs) to the Dáil, on the system of proportional representation by means of the single transferable vote (PR-STV).

History 
The constituency was created for the 1937 general election, when the Electoral (Revision of Constituencies) Act 1935 split the old Leitrim–Sligo constituency, with County Sligo being represented from 1937 through the new Sligo constituency.

Under the Electoral (Amendment) Act 1947, the Leitrim constituency was abolished, and the Sligo–Leitrim constituency was created for the 1948 general election.

Boundaries 
Some Dáil constituencies cross county boundaries, in order to ensure a reasonably consistent ratio of electors to TDs. The 1935 Act defines the boundaries of the Leitrim constituency as being:

TDs

Elections

1944 general election

1943 general election

1938 general election

1937 general election

See also 
Dáil constituencies
Politics of the Republic of Ireland
Historic Dáil constituencies
Elections in the Republic of Ireland

References

External links 
Oireachtas Members Database

Dáil constituencies in the Republic of Ireland (historic)
Historic constituencies in County Leitrim
1937 establishments in Ireland
1948 disestablishments in Ireland
Constituencies established in 1937
Constituencies disestablished in 1948